The Kamatapur Autonomous Council is an autonomous council in the Kamtapur region of the Indian state of Assam, for development and protection of ethnic Koch Rajbongshi people. It was formed in 2020. It includes the whole  of the Undivided Goalpara district, excluding Bodoland Territorial Council and Rabha Hasong Autonomous Council areas.

History
The Kamatapur Autonomous Council Bill 2020 was tabled in Assam Legislative Assembly on 24 March 2020 by the BJP led NDA government and it was passed in September 2020. The bill received objections from Indian National Congress and AIUDF.

Administration
The Kamatapur Autonomous Council consists of 30 members. 26 of these members are elected directly and 4 members are nominated by the Governor.

In January 2021, the Assam State Government said it will constitute interim councils for Kamatpur Autonomous Council as elections to the autonomous council can't be done before the 2021 Assam Legislative Assembly election. A 30 member interim council was appointed in February 2021.

See also
 Kamtapur

References

Autonomous district councils of India
Local government in Assam